Fractals is a peer-reviewed scientific journal devoted to explaining complex phenomena using fractal geometry and scaling. It is published by World Scientific and has explored diverse topics from turbulence and colloidal aggregation to stock markets.

Abstracting and indexing 
The journal is indexed and abstracted in:

According to the Journal Citation Reports, the journal has a 2018 impact factor of 1.629.

References

External links 
 

Mathematics journals
English-language journals
World Scientific academic journals
Quarterly journals
Publications established in 1993